H. B. I. "Rik" de Lange (born 31 July 1956 in Arnhem) is a Dutch politician. He is a member of the Labour Party, and mayor of the Gelderland municipality Duiven.

References

1956 births
Living people
Labour Party (Netherlands) politicians
People from Arnhem
People from Duiven
Mayors in Gelderland